Brownton is an unincorporated community and coal town in Barbour County, West Virginia, United States. Brownton had a post office, which closed on January 24, 2004.

References

Unincorporated communities in Barbour County, West Virginia
Unincorporated communities in West Virginia
Coal towns in West Virginia